Abortion in France is legal on demand during the first 14 weeks from conception. Abortions at later stages of pregnancy up until birth are allowed if two physicians certify that the abortion will be done to prevent injury to the physical or mental health of the pregnant woman; a risk to the life of the pregnant woman; or that the child will suffer from a particularly severe illness recognized as incurable. The abortion law was liberalized by the Veil Law (fr) in 1975.

History

In the Middle Ages, abortion was considered a cardinal sin by Catholic Church teaching. Abortion was a felony, with a prison sentence of 20 years, during the First French Republic, but was no longer punishable by death. The 1810 Napoleonic Code retained felony status. In 1939, the Penal Code was altered to permit an abortion that would save the pregnant woman's life. During the German occupation during World War II, the Vichy régime made abortion a capital crime. The last person to be executed for abortion was Marie-Louise Giraud, who was guillotined on 30 July 1943. Following the war, the death penalty for abortion was abolished, but abortion continued to be prosecuted vigorously.

Illegal abortion rates remained fairly high during the post-war period, and increasing numbers of women began to travel to the United Kingdom to procure abortions after the UK legalized abortion in 1967. France legalized abortion in Law 75-17 of 18 January 1975, which permitted a woman to receive an abortion on request until the tenth week of pregnancy. After a trial period, Law 75-17 was adopted permanently in December 1979.

Since 1982, much of the costs of abortions are taken in charge by the French social security system.

France was the first country to legalize the use of RU-486 as an abortifacient in 1988, allowing its use up to seven weeks of pregnancy under supervision of a physician. By a United Nations Population Division estimate, 19% of all French abortions used RU-486 .

21st century liberalization
Several reforms took place in the 21st century, further liberalizing access to abortion. The ten-week limit was extended to the twelfth week in 2001, and it was extended to fourteen weeks in 2022. Also since 2001, minor girls no longer need mandatory parental consent. A pregnant girl under the age of 18 may ask for an abortion without consulting her parents first if she is accompanied to the clinic by an adult of her choice, who must not tell her parents or any third party about the abortion. Until 2015, the law imposed a seven-day "cool-off" period between the patient's first request for an abortion and a written statement confirming her decision (the delay could be reduced to two days if the patient was getting close to 12 weeks). That mandatory waiting period was abolished on 9 April 2015.

Two medical consultations are mandatory before performing an abortion.

In 2022, the French National Assembly voted 337-32 to start the process of enshrining the right to abortion in the French Constitution. The bill needs to go through the Senate and then a national referendum to be fully enshrined.

Prevalence
, the abortion rate was 17.4 abortions per 1,000 women aged 15–44, a slight increase over the 2002 rate of 16.9 abortions per 1,000 women aged 15–44.

Total number of abortions
Includes the Overseas departments of France (French Guiana, Guadeloupe, Martinique, Mayotte and Réunion).

See also
 Abortion law
 Abortion debate
 Abortion-rights movements
 Birth control in France
 Catholic Church and abortion
 Feminism in France
 March for Life (Paris)

References

 
Law of France
1975 establishments in France
1975 in law
Abortion by country